Paula Klamburg Roque (born 20 September 1989 in Barcelona) is a retired Spanish competitor in synchronized swimming. She won a bronze medal in the team competition at the 2012 Summer Olympics.  She announced her retirement after Spanish team did not qualify for the 2016 Summer Olympics.  She began training in synchronised swimming in 1997 and made her international debut at the 2009 World Championships.

Notes

References

External links 
 
 
 

1989 births
Living people
Spanish synchronized swimmers
Olympic synchronized swimmers of Spain
Olympic medalists in synchronized swimming
Olympic bronze medalists for Spain
Synchronized swimmers at the 2012 Summer Olympics
Medalists at the 2012 Summer Olympics
World Aquatics Championships medalists in synchronised swimming
Synchronized swimmers at the 2009 World Aquatics Championships
Synchronized swimmers at the 2011 World Aquatics Championships
Synchronized swimmers at the 2013 World Aquatics Championships
Synchronized swimmers at the 2015 World Aquatics Championships
Swimmers from Barcelona